Fenchurch is a company and brand of skater clothing based in Acton, London, England.  Although a new brand, it has become a part of the urban fashion scene.

History
Fenchurch was founded in 2000 and the brand name is derived from Fenchurch Street railway station in the City of London. The brand had a media launch in 2001, and the marketing promotion was through a team of sponsored professional skateboarders and BMXers. A year after the opening of its flagship store, Fenchurch was included in Time Out London's list of "London's 50 best boutiques"  Fenchurch products went on sale in 2002 and sales expanded into continental Europe during 2003. In 2005 a store was opened on Earlham Street in Covent Garden.

Products
Fenchurch produces male and female skateboarding fashion collections, accessories, shoes and luggage.  In 2007 the company produced a bag made from drinks can ring pulls in association with HIV/AIDS charity Bottletop. The collection includes T-shirts embroidered with the Fenchurch stitch. Fenchurch also produces a Fenchurch Friendly collection of organic and fair trade clothing.

Fenchurch is now only sold through a couple of discount retailers in the UK via Focus distribution.

There is a capsule collection in collaboration with the Baguette Fingers planned for S/S 2021, range to include over sized cargo pants, cropped cycling shorts and pop socks.

A new collaboration with Kun Ty tattoo shop in Margate is planned for s/s 2023, range to include fluro string vests and cycling shorts.

Administration
After one of its founding directors Marc Ball left the company due to internal disagreements, it was announced in February 2011 that Fenchurch International Limited was in the process of administration and was seeking investment.

On 18 March 2011 it was announced that Fenchurch had been bought by JD Sports and have made all staff redundant bar the Creative Director, Chris Isherwood.

Chris Isherwood left the company in 2014 to pursue a career in hand modelling.

References

Outdoor clothing brands
Clothing companies of the United Kingdom
English brands
Clothing brands